Christopher Lawne was an English merchant and Puritan of note, who was among the earliest settlers in the Virginia Colony in the early 17th century. Born in Blandford, Dorset, he emigrated on the Marygold in May 1618 and died in Virginia the following year.

Lawne's Creek, on the south bank of the James in present-day Isle of Wight County, is named for Christopher Lawne. He established a plantation there with 15-20 other Puritan colonists. Lawne sat as a burgess in Governor Yeardley's First General Assembly of the Virginia House of Burgesses, Governor and Council of Virginia in July 1619, Soon thereafter, Lawne fell ill and died that November. His will was witnessed by Nathaniel West (younger brother of Thomas West, Lord De La Warr), and surgeon Pharao Flynton.

Like many English Dissenters, Lawne initially left England for the Netherlands, drawn by its greater religious tolerance. He was an Elder among the Ancient Brethren of Francis Johnson's church. However, he eventually grew disenchanted with the often-fractious sect, and eventually returned to London. There he had published  in 1612 and Brownism turned the inside outward: Being a Parallel between the Profession and the Practice of the Brownists' religion. By Christopher Lawne, lately returned from that wicked Separation London, 1613.

He may have been influenced in his writings by the Rev. John Paget of Nantwich, Cheshire, first minister of the English Reformed Church in Amsterdam.

External links
Christopher Lawne and the Isle of Wight Plantation
English Puritans in Holland

References

Arber, Edward. The Story of the Pilgrim Fathers, 1606-1623 A.D.: As Told by Themselves, Their Friends, and Their Enemies London: Ward and Downey, 1897.
Boddie, John Bennett. Seventeenth Century Isle of Wight County, Virginia; A History of the County of Isle of Wight, Virginia, During the Seventeenth Century, Including Abstracts of the County Records Baltimore: Genealogical Pub. Co, 1973.
Sprunger, Keith L. Dutch Puritanism A History of English and Scottish Churches of the Netherlands in the Sixteenth and Seventeenth Centuries Studies in the history of Christian thought, v. 31. Leiden: Brill, 1982.
Sprunger, Keith L. Trumpets from the Tower: English Puritan Printing in the Netherlands 1600-1640 E.J. Brill Leiden Boston 1994.
Stanard, William G. and Mary Newton Stanard. The Virginia Colonial Register. Albany, NY: Joel Munsell's Sons Publishers, 1902. , Retrieved July 15, 2011.

1619 deaths
English emigrants
English separatists
Virginia colonial people
House of Burgesses members
American planters
Year of birth unknown
People from Blandford Forum
People from Isle of Wight County, Virginia